Margot Llobera Farré (born 18 May 1996) is an Andorran rally raid motorcycle rider and retired footballer who played as a defender. She was a member of the Andorra women's national team. She also participated as a motorbiker in the 2019 FIM Bajas World Cup at the Baja Aragón and as a side-by-side co-driver at the 2022 Dakar Rally.

She is the niece of paraplegic rally driver and former alpine skier Albert Llovera.

See also
List of Andorra women's international footballers

References

1996 births
Living people
Andorran women's footballers
Women's association football defenders
Andorra women's international footballers
Female motorcycle racers

Dakar Rally co-drivers